Il Rovescio della Medaglia, or RDM, were an Italian hard rock and symphonic rock band. They are most famous for their symphonic rock piece Contaminazione, released in 1973. It contained four pieces from Bach's Well-tempered Clavier seamlessly integrated with RDM's own music, which often was inspired by rock or hard rock. In 1974 the record was released in an English version, Contamination, with the group's name simplified to RDM, although still written in full on the back of the LP jacket.

The band was produced by Luis Enríquez Bacalov.

The band split up in 1977, but reformed in 1993.

Personnel
As listed on Contamination:
Gino Campoli - percussives
Enzo Vita - guitar
Stefano Urso - bass
Franco di Sabbatino - keyboard
Pino Ballarini - vocals

Discography
La Bibbia (1971)
Io come io (1972)
Contaminazione (1973) 
Contamination (English version of Contaminazione, 1975)
Giudizio avrai (1988)
Vitae (1993)
Il Ritorno (1995)

CD releases
Contaminazione
South Korea, Si-Wan Records SRMC 1002, 1992. Booklet in Korean and (original) Italian.

See also
Italian progressive rock
Il Balletto di Bronzo
Il Banco del Mutuo Soccorso
I Cervello
La Locanda delle Fate
Le Orme
Osanna
Nova
La Premiata Forneria Marconi

Italian progressive LPs re-recorded in English
Felona e Sorona by Le Orme
Per un amico by Premiata Forneria Marconi
L'isola di niente by Premiata Forneria Marconi
Maxophone by Maxophone

References

Sources
 
 
 
 

Italian progressive rock groups